

Uoniverse is an album by jazz bassist Ugonna Okegwo released in 2002. The album is Okegwo's first release as a leader. The album consists of five original compositions by Okegwo and five new arrangements of jazz classics, including Thelonious Monk's "Let's Call This". Jazzreview.com gave the album a rating of 4 stars and called Okegwo one of the leading bassists of his generation. All About Jazz highly recommended the album, calling it "truly diverse" and the band's rhythm "impeccable".

Track listing

Personnel
Credits adapted from AllMusic.

Ugonna Okegwo – arranger, composer, producer, primary artist, audio production, double bass
Xavier Davis – piano
Donald Edwards – drums
Sam Newsome – guest artist, sax (soprano)
Ray Evans – composer
Jay Livingston – composer
Thelonious Monk – composer
Ray Noble – composer
Jaco Pastorius – composer
Wayne Shorter – composer
Katsuhiko Naito – mastering
Jordi Vidal – audio engineer, engineer

References

External links
Ugonna Okegwo, Official Website

2002 albums
Ugonna Okegwo albums